Sankarankoil is a state assembly constituency in Tamil Nadu. It is a Scheduled Caste reserved constituency. Elections and winners in the constituency are listed below. It is a part of the Tenkasi Lok Sabha constituency. It is one of the 234 State Legislative Assembly Constituencies in Tamil Nadu.

Members of the Legislative Assembly

Madras State

Tamil Nadu 

* By-Elections were held on the account of vacancy due to the demise of the sitting MLA

Election Results

2021

2016

2012 By-election

2011

2006

2001

1996

1991

1989

1984

1980

1977

1971

1967

1962

1957

1952

References

External links
 

Assembly constituencies of Tamil Nadu